A Man and a Woman is a 1966 French film directed by Claude Lelouch.

A Man and a Woman may also refer to:

 The Secret Lovers, also known as A Man and a Woman, a 2005 South Korean television series
 A Man and a Woman (2016 film), a South Korean film directed by Lee Yoon-ki
 A Man and a Woman: 20 Years Later, a 1986 French drama film, a sequel to the 1966 film
 A Man and a Woman (album), an album by Johnny Lytle
 A Mann & A Woman, an album by Herbie Mann
 "A Man and a Woman", "Un homme et une femme" in French, title song from the film A Man and a Woman
 "A Man and a Woman" (song), a song by U2
 A Man and A Woman (Campin), a c. 1435 painting by Robert Campin

See also 
 A Woman and a Man, an album by Belinda Carlisle
 Man and Woman (disambiguation)